Agery is a locality in the Australian state of South Australia located on Yorke Peninsula. It is situated 17 km south-east of Moonta. Its name comes from the Aboriginal word ngadjali meaning "pipe clay".

History 
Agery School opened in 1880 and operated for over 100 years. It closed in 1982. Agery Post Office opened in December 1890.  Agery Methodist Church, originally known as the New Wesleyan Chapel, was built in 1885 and remained open until 1970.

Features 
Agery Reserve is a small nature reserve that is managed by the Moonta Branch of the National Trust of South Australia. It comprises 3.3 ha of mallee scrub.

Governance
Agery is located within the federal division of Grey, the state electoral district of Narungga and the local government area of the Yorke Peninsula Council.

See also
 List of cities and towns in South Australia

References

Towns in South Australia
Yorke Peninsula